The men's 1 km time trial competition at the 2021 UEC European Track Championships was held on 6 October 2021.

Results

Qualifying
The top 8 riders qualified for the final.

Final

References

Men's 1 km time trial
European Track Championships – Men's 1 km time trial